Rattlettrap may refer to:
"Death Sex Rattletrap" (1989), a song by Chainsaw Kittens, an alternative rock band
Richard Hudson Rattletrap,  a character in The Disappointment, one of the first American operas, it was to have been performed on 20 April 1762 in Philadelphia
Rattletrap (Transformers) - a fictional character.
 Slang for a decrepit car